Alain Monié (born 1951) is the chief executive officer and a director for Ingram Micro Inc.

Education
Monié received his education in France. He earned his master's degree in business administration from the Institut des Affaires (HEC Paris) in Jouy-en-Josas. He was recognized with high honors for his studies in automation engineering which he pursued at the Ecole Nationale Supérieure d'Arts et Métiers.

Career
Monié began his career as a civil construction engineer in Mexico City, moving on to general management positions at Sogitec Inc., and was a controller for Renault. Monié joined Ingram Micro Inc. in February 2003 as executive vice president and was appointed president of the Asia-Pacific region a year later. From 2007 until 2010 he was president and chief operating officer of Ingram Micro. Following one year as CEO of Asia Pacific Resources International Limited (APRIL), a pulp and paper company headquartered in Singapore, he returned to Ingram Micro as chief operating officer and was named CEO of Ingram Micro in January 2012.

Personal life
Monié is a resident of Orange County, California, not far from the headquarters of Ingram Micro in Irvine.

References

Living people
1951 births
French expatriates in the United States
People from Orange County, California
Businesspeople from California
Amazon (company) people